The Rosses (officially known by its Irish language name, Na Rosa; in the genitive case Na Rosann) is a geographical and social region in the west of County Donegal, Ireland, with a population of over 7,000 centred on the town of Dungloe, which acts as the educational, shopping and civic centre for the area. Defined by physical boundaries in the form of rivers, as well as history and language use, the area has a distinctive identity, separate from the rest of Donegal. The extensive region lies between the parish of Gweedore to the north and the town of Glenties to the south. A large part of the Rosses is in the Gaeltacht, which means that Irish is the spoken language. The Rosses, Cloughaneely and Gweedore, known locally as "the three parishes" with 16,000 Irish speakers, together form a social and cultural region different from the rest of the county, with Gweedore serving as the main centre for socialising and industry. Gaeltacht an Láir is another Irish-speaking area.

Irish language
The following is a list of electoral divisions in the area with the percentage that speak Irish:

 An Clochán Liath (1,785) (15%)
 Anagaire (2,138) (55%)
 Arainn Mhor (529) (62%)
 Inis Mhic an Doirn (1,410) (9%)
 An Duchoraidh (78) (34%)
 Leitir Mhic an Bhaird (650) (19%)
 An Machaire (615) (15%)
 Cro Bheithe (170) (60%)

Culture

Once a predominantly Irish-speaking area, over recent generations English has become increasingly common. Irish is still used extensively in some areas including parts of the island of Arranmore, the townland of Ranafast and the village of Annagry.  In some areas, like the hills around Dungloe, around Loughanure and in pockets of Doochary and Lettermacaward, the Irish language is predominant.

The local people are said to have a preference for Gaelic football over football, which is often the case in rural areas of the country. The area fields a number of football teams, both in football and Gaelic football. Keadue Rovers from the lower Rosses have traditionally been the area's strongest football team, and there are also teams in Arranmore (Arranmore United F.C.) and in Maghery (Strand Rovers F.C.).
An Clochán Liath have traditionally been the strongest in Gaelic football, winning seven County Championships between 1930 and 1958. There are also teams in Mullaghderg (Naomh Muire), and in Lettermacaward (Na Rossa).

There is a strong tradition of songwriting in the area, Seán McBride (1906–1996) from Cruit Island wrote the popular song "The Homes of Donegal".

There are connections between the people of the Rosses and Scotland, Glasgow in particular, due to the economic need for emigration in the past and the strong ties forged over the generations as a result. Many people from the Rosses, in common with people from other parts of County Donegal, have also settled in the City of Derry, especially since the late 1840s.

Geography
The area is bounded by the River Gweebarra to the south, the Gweedore River to the north, the Derryveagh Mountains and the Gweebarra River (Doochary Bridge) to the east and the Atlantic Ocean to the west. The name comes from "Ros", the Irish word for headland. The area presents a rocky barren landscape, studded with a myriad of lakes and inlets of the sea. Lakes include Lough Anure, Lough Craghy, Dunglow Lough and Lough Meela.

Transport
The Rosses boasts Donegal's only airport at Carrickfinn. Various coach companies serve the area.

History
The Rosses has been inhabited since time immemorial, and the ancient church of St Crona in Termon near Dungloe has been dated to the 6th century AD. It was the site of a monastery founded by St. Crona, a cousin of the Royal Saint called Columcille, founder of the monastic settlement at Iona, and was the centre of the parish of Templecrone.

In the 16th century, a number of ships from the Spanish Armada sank off or landed off its coast.

Economy
Historically the Rosses has relied heavily on hospitality, tourism and the fishing industry as the mainstays of its economy. The area has its own indigenous supermarket chain called The Cope which has been quite successful. There is very little manufacturing industry in the Rosses apart from a few companies located in Dungloe.

Tourism
The area claims a large proportion of Donegal's tourist income, due to its renowned scenery and its many festivals, including the Mary From Dungloe International Festival. There is a very strong tradition of marching bands emanating from the region; the area boasts many All-Ireland championship bands in all grades and disciplines.

Notable people
 Declan Bonner, member of 1992 All-Ireland winning Donegal team
 Packie Bonner, former Ireland and Celtic goalkeeper
 Tony Boyle, 1992 All Star and member of 1992 All-Ireland winning Donegal team
 Joseph Duffy, UFC mixed martial artist
 Pat "the Cope" Gallagher, former TD and former MEP
 Goats Don't Shave, folk band
 Adrian Hanlon, member of 2012 All-Ireland winning Donegal panel
 Niall Ó Dónaill, lexicographer
 Daniel O'Donnell, singer
 Peadar O'Donnell, socialist and author
 Margo, singer
 Seosamh Mac Grianna, author
 Carl McHugh, footballer for Motherwell
 Séamus Ó Grianna, author
 Skara Brae, folk band
 Adrian Sweeney, 2003 All Star footballer

Townlands
 Acres
 Annagry (Anagaire)
 Arlands
 Belcruit
 Braade (An Bhráid)
 Burtonport (Ailt an Chorráin)
 Carrickfinn (Carraig Fhinne or Carraig Fhinn)
 Cloughlass
 Crickamore
 Crolly (Croithlí)(half of which is situated in Gweedore)
 Derrynamansher (Doire na Mainséar)
 Doochary (An Dúchoraidh)
 Drumnacart Mountain Pasture
 Dungloe (An Clochán Liath)
 Keadue (Céideadh)
 Kerrytown
 Kincasslagh (Cionn Caslach)
 Lackenagh
 Lettermacaward/Leitir (Leitir Mhic an Bhaird)
 Loughanure (Loch an Iúir)
 Maghery (An Mhachaire)
 Meenagowan (Min A Ghabhann)
 Meenaleck
 Meenbanad
 Mullaghduff (Mullach Dubh)
 Ranafast (Rann na Feirste)
 Roshine
 Tullyillion

Islands
 Arranmore (Árainn Mhór)
 Cruit (An Chruit)
 Eighter (An tÍochtar)
 Inishal (Inis Saille)
 Inishcoo (Inis Cú)
 Inishfree (Inis Fraoigh)
 Inishkeeragh (Inis Caorach)
 Owey (Oileán Uaighe)
 Rutland (Inis Mhic an Doirn)

See also
County Galway
Galway City Gaeltacht
Gaeltacht Cois Fharraige
Conamara Theas
Aran Islands
Joyce Country
County Donegal
Gaoth Dobhair
Cloch Cheann Fhaola
Gaeltacht an Láir
County Kerry
Gaeltacht Corca Dhuibhne
County Mayo
Gaeltacht Iorrais agus Acaill

County Londonderry

 Carn Tóchair

County Antrim

 An Cheathrú Gaeltachta, Béal Feirste

References

External links
Gaeltacht Irish language use 2007

 
Gaeltacht places in County Donegal
Geography of County Donegal